Thomas Adamson is a Scottish professional footballer who played as an inside left. Playing for junior side Lochee Harp, Adamson signed for Dundee United in August 1937, although – like most of the club's playing staff – he was released at the end of the season. After playing for Forfar Athletic, Adamson returned to Tannadice Park for the 1939-40 season, where he played in the Emergency War Cup Final before being called up for active service. Returning to play at the end of the 1944-45 season, it is unknown where Adamson went after leaving United.

Honours
 Emergency War Cup Runner-up: 1
 1939–40

References

Possibly living people
Association football wingers
Lochee Harp F.C. players
Dundee United F.C. players
Forfar Athletic F.C. players
Scottish footballers
Scottish Football League players
Scottish Junior Football Association players
Year of birth missing
Place of birth missing (living people)